The Manawatu Estuary is an estuary at the mouth of the Manawatu River, near Foxton Beach in the lower North Island of New Zealand. It is a wetland of international significance as one of the few Ramsar sites in New Zealand.

A total of 93 different bird species have been identified at the estuary. In 2005 the estuary attained Ramsar status.

During spring migratory birds arrive for the summer at the estuary, including the bar-tailed godwit, red knot, Pacific golden plover, Japanese snipe, wandering tattler and whimbrel.

See also
Wetlands of New Zealand
Environment of New Zealand

References

Ramsar sites in New Zealand
Landforms of Manawatū-Whanganui
Horowhenua District
Estuaries of New Zealand